Colors Straight Up is a 1997 American documentary film directed by Michèle Ohayon about the non-profit organization Colors United, which teaches drama to inner city youth. The film depicts the creation of a musical called Watts Side Story. It was nominated for an Academy Award for Best Documentary Feature.

References

External links

Colors Straight Up at Alexander Street, successor to Filmakers Library

1997 films
1997 documentary films
American documentary films
Documentary films about theatre
Films shot in Los Angeles
Documentary films about African Americans
Documentary films about children
Children's theatre
1990s English-language films
Films directed by Michèle Ohayon
1990s American films